Drăguțești is a commune in Gorj County, Oltenia, Romania. It is composed of six villages: Cârbești, Dâmbova, Drăguțești, Iași-Gorj, Tâlvești and Urechești.

References

Communes in Gorj County
Localities in Oltenia